Pappakudi (North) is a village in the Udayarpalayam taluk of Ariyalur district, Tamil Nadu, India.

Demographics 

As per the 2001 census, Pappakudi (North) had a total population of 3467 with 1722 males and 1745 females.

References 

Villages in Ariyalur district